The Diocese of Jaffna is a Latin Church ecclesiastical territory or diocese of the Catholic Church in northern Sri Lanka. Latin Catholicism in the diocese's territory date to the time of St. Francis Xavier. The current bishop is Justin Gnanapragasam.

History
The Apostolic Vicariate of Jaffna was created on 17 February 1845 from the Diocese of Ceylon. On 1 September 1886 it was promoted to a diocese. On 25 August 1893 parts of diocese were transferred to newly created Diocese of Trincomalee. On 19 December 1975 parts of diocese were transferred to newly created Apostolic Prefecture of Anuradhapura.  On 24 January 1981 parts of diocese were transferred to newly created Diocese of Mannar.

Origins
In 1548 St. Francis visited Mannar and came to Jaffna to persuade the king to cease his persecutions against the Christians.

In 1580, under the protection of the Portuguese, the first Catholic church was built at Jaffna. The whole peninsula having surrendered in 1591 to André Furtado de Mendonça, almost the entire population embraced Christianity. When the fort of Jaffna capitulated to the Dutch in 1658 there were in the peninsula 50 priests, 1 Jesuit college, 1 Franciscan and 1 Dominican convent, and 14 churches. For safety the  famous miraculous  Statue of Our Lady of Miracles, Jaffna patao  ( புதுமை மாதா / Puthumai Matha 1614-1658) was smuggled out of the island by Portuguese prisoners. Since 1658, the  Protectress of Jaffna  is in exile  in the church of Sao Pedro situated along the Mandovi river in Bainguinim, Goa, India.

Dutch period
The Dutch immediately manifested the most hostile disposition towards the Catholics. The priests and monks were banished, and giving them shelter was declared a capital offence. From that time dates the long persecution which ended only with the surrender of Ceylon to the British in 1796. To this diocese belongs the Island of Mannar rendered famous by the apostolic labours of St. Francis Xavier and by the martyrdom of 600 to 700 Christians, executed by order of the King of Jaffna. Madhu, though a solitary spot in the middle of the jungle, has also its historical fame. For a long time during the Dutch persecution it was the refuge of native Christians. To this spot they had transported a statue of Our Lady which is enshrined in the new church. Madhu has developed into an important pilgrimage, where more than 40,000 pilgrims congregate every year for the feast of the Visitation.

British period
In 1845 Ceylon was divided into the two vicariates of Colombo and Jaffna, with Bishop Orazio Bettachini as vicar Apostolic of the latter. In 1847 the Oblates of Mary Immaculate arrived in Ceylon. In 1857 the Jaffna vicariate was handed over to the Oblates, and on the death of Bishop Bettachini, Bishop Semeria, O.M.I., was appointed vicar Apostolic. In 1868 Bishop Christopher Bonjean, also O.M.I., succeeded Bishop Semeria. He had been in the missions for nine years in India and in 1856 had crossed over to Ceylon to join the Oblate Congregation. During his administration a great impulse was given to primary education. The effects of the Protestant and Hindu schools were more than counterbalanced by the activity of the bishop and the missionaries. Subsequently Bishop Bonjean was transferred to the metropolitan see of Colombo. Bishop Theophile Melirzan, O.M.I., succeeded him at Jaffna and, following in his footsteps, was named Archbishop of Colombo in 1893. In the same year Henri Joulain, Q.M.I., was appointed Bishop of Jaffna.

20th century
The entire population of the diocese in the early 20th century was 499,200; the Catholics numbering 45,500; the diocese was in the hands of the Oblates; 3 secular priests helping in the parochial ministry. The total number of missionaries was 46. Attached to the cathedral is St. Martin's seminary for the education of junior students aspiring to the priesthood. St. Patrick's college and boarding school is the most flourishing institution of the northern province. It has a staff of 6 European fathers, 1 native father, 2 brothers, and 15 native professors. The average number of students is 450. It is especially devoted to higher English education, and prepares its students for the Cambridge Junior and Senior examinations and for the London University Intermediate. Some years ago it was thought expedient to come into closer contact with non-Catholics and especially with the higher classes of Hindus. For this purpose a Hindu boarding school was attached to St. Patrick's College. The boarders number 100, with good prospects for the future. Jaffna convent, conducted by the Sisters of the Holy Family of Bordeaux, follows the same junior and senior courses, for the education of girls, as St. Patrick's. To the convent is attached a girls' orphanage. The native Brothers of St. Joseph are occupied in teaching at Jaffna, Kayts, Mannar and Mullaitivu. The native Sisters of St. Peter conduct primary schools in all the important stations of the diocese. There are 127 schools under the control of the missionaries, for the vernacular and primary English education. At the two industrial schools of Colombogam and Mullaitivu 125 orphan boys are taught agriculture and useful trades. The diocese has conferences of St. Vincent de Paul and young men's associations for the working classes. St. Joseph's Catholic Press is the home of the Jaffna Catholic Guardian, a weekly paper devoted to the interests of the diocese. A Catholic Club has just been founded for the purpose of interests of the Catholic community.

Bishops, Vicars Apostolics and Pro-Vicar Apostolics

Other officials  

 Vicar General   -   Rev.Fr. Pathinathan Josephdas Jebaratnam 
 Chancellor   - Rev.Fr.S.V.B Mangalarajah
 Judicial Vicar  - Rev. T.J Kirubakaran
 Financial Administrator - Rev.Fr. S. Nesanayagam

Activities and organizations

Spiritual centers 

 Divine retreat center, Jaffna
 Sangamam, Kopy

Catholic Educational Institutions 

 St. Patrick's College, Jaffna    
 St. Don Bosco School
 St.Henry's College, Illavalai.
 St.Antony's College, Kayts.

Major Catholic organizations 

 Caritas- Hudec    
 Catechetical Center 
 Ahavoli 
 Commission for Justice and Peace

Notable churches 

 St.Mary's Cathedral , Jaffna.
 Our Lady of Refuge , Jaffna 
 St.Antony's Church, Jaffna
 St.James, Church, Gurunagar, Jaffna
 Our lady of Miracle, Gurunagar, Jaffna
 St. Sebastian Church, Gurunagar, Jaffna,
 Our Lady of Velankani, Gurunagar, Jaffna
 St. Roche Church, Gurunagar, Jaffna
 Christ the King Church, Koiyathottam, Jaffna
 St. John's Church, Jaffna
 St.Thersa Church, Jaffna
 Our lady of Rosary, Jaffna
 Infant Jesus Church, Jaffna
 St.Joseph Church, Jaffna
 St.Annes Church, Jaffna
 St. Benedict's Church, Nallur
 St. Jude Church, Ariyalai
 Mount Carmel Church, Gurunagar
 Holy redeemer Church, Maniyanthottam
 St. Nichlos Church, Navanturai
 St.Antony’s Church, Manipay
 Our lady of Fatima, Pandatheripu
 Kathirai Madha Church, Sillalai
 Our lady of Lourdes, Point Pedro
 St.Thomas Church, Point Pedro
 Our lady of Velankani, Point Pedro
 St.Joseph Church, Point Pedro
 St.Antony’s Church, Nelliady
 St. Peter’s Church, Navaly
 St. Joseph Church , Atchuvely
 St.Antony’s Church, Atchuvely
 Mount Carmel Church, Vasavilan
 St.James Church, Vasavilan 
 St. Antony’s Church, Kayts
St.Peter’s Church, Kayts
St.Thomas Church, Kayts
St.Mary’s Church Kayts
Holy Family Church, Uduvil
St.Michel’s Church, Urumpirai
St. Theresa Church, Kilinocchi
St.Jude Church, Kanagapuram
Fatima Church, Uruthirapuram
St.Antony's Church, Thondaman Nagar
St. Peter’s Church , Mullaitiv
Our lady of Velankani , Nachikuda

Religious congregation

Religious Institute of Men 

 Oblate of Mary Immaculate
 Rosarians
 Sons of the Immaculate Heart of the Blessed Virgin Mary ( Claretians) 
 De Monfort Brothers

Religious Institute of Women 

 Sisters of Holy Family
 Sisters of Holy Cross
 Sisters of Apostolic Carmel
 Rosarian Sisters
 Mother Teresa Sisters
 Sisters of St. Joseph Cluny

References

 
1845 establishments in Ceylon
Organisations based in Northern Province, Sri Lanka
Religious organizations established in 1845
Jaffna